The Suheldev Bharatiya Samaj Party is an Indian political party founded in 2002. The party is led by Om Prakash Rajbhar, former Minister of Backward Classes Welfare, Disabled People development in Uttar Pradesh. The party has its headquarters in Rasra, Ballia district. The party has a yellow flag.

Profile
SBSP is based primarily amongst the Rajbhar community in eastern Uttar Pradesh.

The party calls for the inclusion of the Rajbhar community in the list of Scheduled Tribess. However, it also favours the setting up of reservation quotas on socio-economic grounds.

Indian general election, 2004
SBSP fielded 14 candidates in the 2004 Indian general election, one in Bihar and the rest in Uttar Pradesh. Together they obtained 275,267 votes (0.07% of the nationwide vote).

Bihar assembly elections, 2005
The party contested the February 2005 Bihar Legislative Assembly election with three candidates. Together they obtained 13,655 votes (0.06% of the statewide vote).  SBSP fielded two candidates in the subsequent October 2005 Legislative Assembly election in Bihar. Together they obtained 11,037 votes (0.05% of the statewide vote).

Uttar Pradesh assembly election, 2007
The party contested 97 candidates in the 2007 Uttar Pradesh Legislative Assembly election. All but three candidates forfeited their deposits. It obtained a total of 491,347 votes (0.94% of the statewide vote).

Indian general election, 2009
Ahead of the 2009 Indian general election SBSP joined the Apna Dal-led coalition Adhikar Manch ('Rights Platform'), an alliance of BSP splinter groups. SBSP fielded twenty candidates, who together obtained 319,307 votes, though all forfeited their deposits

Bihar assembly election, 2010
The party fielded six candidates in the 2010 Bihar Legislative Assembly election. Together they obtained 15,437 votes (0.05% of the statewide vote).

Uttar Pradesh assembly election, 2012
The party ran 52 candidates in the 2012 Uttar Pradesh Legislative Assembly election. All but four candidates forfeited their deposits. In total the party obtained 477,330 votes (0.63% of the statewide vote).

Indian general election, 2014
SBSP fielded 13 candidates in the 2014 Indian general election, whom together mustered 118,947 votes (0.02% of the nationwide vote). Ahead of the election SBSP took part in forming the Ekta Manch ('Unity Platform'), a coalition of smaller parties in Uttar Pradesh. Om Prakash Rajbhar served as convenor of the coalition.

Bihar assembly election, 2015

In 2015 Bihar Legislative Assembly election, SBSP contested in only 2 seats but could not win any of them. though Azad Paswan a candidate came in 3rd in polls.

Uttar Pradesh assembly election, 2017

In 2017 Uttar Pradesh Legislative Assembly election working in alliance with BJP, SBSP contested 8 seats in UP and won 5 seats with party leader Om Prakash Rajbhar becoming a minister in UP government.

Indian general election, 2019

SBSP fielded 39 candidates in the 2019 Indian general election in Uttar Pradesh against BJP. This was in response to ally Bharatiya Janata Party’s proposal that SBSP contest on the saffron party’s lotus symbol from Ghosi in eastern Uttar Pradesh.

Bihar assembly election, 2020

In 2020 Bihar Legislative Assembly election, SBSP contested in only 5 seats as part of Grand Democratic Secular Front that also included Rashtriya Lok Samta Party, Bahujan Samaj Party	Samajwadi Janata Dal Democratic, All India Majlis-e-Ittehadul Muslimeen, and Janvadi Party (Socialist).

Uttar Pradesh assembly election, 2022

In 2022 Uttar Pradesh Legislative Assembly election working in alliance with SP, SBSP contested in 17 seats in UP and won 6 seats with party leader Om Prakash Rajbhar in Uttar Pradesh.

References

 
Political parties in Uttar Pradesh
Political parties in Bihar
Political parties established in 2002
2002 establishments in Uttar Pradesh